William McClelland may refer to:
 William McClelland (politician), member of the U.S. House of Representatives from Pennsylvania
 William C. McClelland, medical doctor and Australian rules football player and administrator
 William McClelland (bishop), American prelate
 Jack McClelland (footballer, born 1930) (William John McClelland), English footballer